The Benois de la Danse is a ballet competition held annually in Moscow. Founded by the International Dance Association in 1991, it takes place each year on or around April 29 and it's judged by a jury. The members of this jury change every year and it consists of only top ballet personages.

Statuettes are given to the winners in the categories of lifelong achievement, ballerina, danseur, choreographer, composer and designer.

The Benois de la Danse earns a cash prize of $1,000,000, as well as exceptional events occurring during the previous year on stages around the world. These include dancing roles of all kinds as well as choreographic accomplishments.

History 

The idea for the Benois de la Danse was initiated in Moscow and the founders succeeded in obtaining the patronage of UNESCO in the autumn of 1992.  Its scheduling at the end of April is meant to coincide with the birthday of the great Alexandre Benois (1870–1960) for whom it is named.

French sculptor Igor Ustinov designed the statuette of the Benois de la Danse award in 1992. He is the son of the famous actor Peter Ustinov, a great-nephew of Alexandre Benois.

Goals of competition 

 To give the Benois audience the best performances of the works that have been entered, regardless of whom they were created by.
 To bring the best representatives of different dance styles and schools together.
 To support veterans of ballet financially, with funds from the gala concerts

Members of the Benois de la Danse jury have included

 
Alessandra Ferri
Alexander Grant
Altynai Asylmuratova
Claude Bessy
Brigitte Lefèvre
Carla Fracci
Davide Bombana
Frank Anderson
Galina Ulanova
Helgi Tomasson
Irina Kolpakova
John Neumeier
John Taras
Karen Kain
Laurent Hilaire
Loipa Araújo
Nadia Nerina
Patrice Bart
Peter Schaufuss
Rudi van Dantzig
Rudolph Nureyev
Sofia Golovkina
Yuri Grigorovich
Yvette Chauviré
Vladimir Malakhov

Laureates of the prize

Composers
George Kouroupos (1996) 
Michel Legrand (2012) 
Joby Talbot (2015) 
Ilya Demutsky (2018)

Designers
Olivier Debré (1998) 
Jaffar Chalabi (2000) 
Jurgen Rose (2002) 
Carlos Gallardo (2007) 
John Macfarlane (2015) 
Ren Dongsheng (2016) 
Kirill Serebrennikov (2018)

Prix "Benois-Moscow Massine-Positano"
Ana Laguna (2015) 
Edward Watson (2015) 
Ekaterina Krysanova (2016) 
Maria Kochetkova (2018)

For High Artistry in Partnership
Alexandre Riabko (2016)

Lifetime achievement

Ballerinas

Danseurs

Choreographers

By categories

Footnotes

External links
 Prix Benois de la Danse website 
 Prix Benois de la Danse website 

 
Ballet awards
Ballet competitions
Events in Moscow